Lloyd Church Lake is a reservoir located south of the city of Wilburton, Oklahoma on a tributary of the Fourche Maline river. The lake is supported by an earthen dam and was constructed in 1964.

The lake is operated by the city of Wilburton. It is also used for fishing.

References

Reservoirs in Oklahoma
Dams completed in 1964